Nicola Cassio (born 9 July 1985 in Trieste) is an Italian freestyle swimmer.

Cassio won several medals mainly as a member of the Italian 4 x 200 m freestyle relay. He participated for Italy in the 2008 Summer Olympics.

References
 
 Nicola Cassio on Italian Swimming Federation's website  

1985 births
Living people
Sportspeople from Trieste
Italian male swimmers
Olympic swimmers of Italy
Swimmers at the 2008 Summer Olympics
Italian male freestyle swimmers
Medalists at the FINA World Swimming Championships (25 m)
European Aquatics Championships medalists in swimming
Universiade medalists in swimming
Universiade gold medalists for Italy
Universiade silver medalists for Italy
Universiade bronze medalists for Italy
Medalists at the 2005 Summer Universiade
Medalists at the 2007 Summer Universiade
Medalists at the 2009 Summer Universiade